The Science Subcommittee on Environment is one of five subcommittees of the United States House Committee on Science, Space and Technology.

History 

Chairs of the subcommittee:
 Andy Harris (R), Maryland, 2013
 Chris Stewart (R), Utah, 2013-2015
 Jim Bridenstine (R), Oklahoma, 2015-2017
 Andy Biggs (R), Arizona, 2017-2019
 Lizzie Pannill Fletcher (D), Texas, 2019-2020
 Mikie Sherrill (D), New Jersey, 2020-present

Jurisdiction 
The Subcommittee on Environment shall have jurisdiction over the following subject matters: 

All matters relating to environmental research; Environmental Protection Agency research and development; environmental standards; climate change research and development; the National Oceanic and Atmospheric Administration, including all activities related to weather, weather services, climate, the atmosphere, marine fisheries, and oceanic research; risk assessment activities; scientific issues related to environmental policy, including climate change;; other appropriate matters as referred by the Chair; and relevant oversight.

Members, 117th Congress

Historical membership rosters

115th Congress
 

Source: Committee on Science, Space, and Technology official Roster

116th Congress

References

External links 
 Subcommittee on Energy and Environment, official website
 Republican Subcommittee website

Science Environment
Science and technology in the United States